Rhynchactis microthrix is a species of whipnose angler only known from the western Indian Ocean where it is found at depths of around .  This species grows to a length of  SL.

References
 

Lophiiformes
Taxa named by Theodore Wells Pietsch III
Fish described in 1998
Fish of the Indian Ocean
Taxa named by Erik Bertelsen